Lou Ann O'Rourke was an American bridge player. She died on Monday, December 16, 2019.

Bridge accomplishments

Wins

 North American Bridge Championships (1)
 Roth Open Swiss Teams (1) 2007

Runners-up

 North American Bridge Championships (8)
 Senior Knockout Teams (1) 2011 
 Grand National Teams (1) 2002 
 Jacoby Open Swiss Teams (3) 2006, 2009, 2011 
 Chicago Mixed Board-a-Match (1) 2001 
 Roth Open Swiss Teams (1) 2009 
 Vanderbilt (1) 2007

Personal life
O'Rourke lived in Portola Valley, California. She was married to the late J. Tracy O'Rourke.

Notes

American contract bridge players